Events in the year 1974 in Bulgaria.

Incumbents 

 General Secretaries of the Bulgarian Communist Party: Todor Zhivkov
 Chairmen of the Council of Ministers: Stanko Todorov

Events 

 Diana Express, a Bulgarian rock band, is formed by Mitko Shterev in Yambol.

Sports 

 The 18th Artistic Gymnastics World Championships were held in the city of Varna. This was the first world championships at which the individual all-around titles were contested in a separate session of competition, rather than being decided after the team competition.
 FC Parva Atomna Kozloduy, a Bulgarian football club from the town of Kozloduy, is founded.

References 

 
1970s in Bulgaria
Years of the 20th century in Bulgaria
Bulgaria
Bulgaria